The following lists events that happened during 1946 in North Korea, then governed by the Provisional People's Committee of North Korea and the People's Committee of North Korea.

Incumbents
Chairman:Kim Il Sung

Events
1946 North Korean local elections
1st Congress of the Workers' Party of North Korea

References

1940s in North Korea
Years of the 20th century in North Korea
1946 in North Korea